Start Football is a United Kingdom sports retailer founded in 1991 and is based in Cramlington, Northumberland. It operates through catalogues, retail shops and its website. It has one retail stores in Newcastle upon Tyne. It is a subsidiary of W & M Wholesale limited and part of the Start group including Start Fitness and Start Cycles.

Start Football supports many local football teams and events, providing sponsorship to youth teams, and discount on football team wear.

Operations
Start Football has been in a number of different locations throughout Newcastle. Today, Start Football has one business units based on Pilgrim Street, Newcastle, with plans on opening more stores nationally.

Awards
 The Journal Fastest 50 businesses for 2014

References 

Clothing retailers of the United Kingdom
Companies based in Northumberland
Online retailers of the United Kingdom
Companies based in Newcastle upon Tyne
British companies established in 1991
Retail companies established in 1991
Sporting goods retailers of the United Kingdom
1991 establishments in the United Kingdom